Francesco Patrizi of Siena (Franciscus Patricius Senensis) (1413–1494) was an Italian political writer, humanist and bishop.

He acted as governor of Foligno, then in the Papal States, for several years from 1461. Pius II, who was a personal friend, appointed him bishop of Gaeta in the same year.

Works
Epitome of Quintilian
De regno et regis institutione, Parisiis, Galeotus a Prato, 1531
De institutione reipublicae

Bibliography

G. Chiarelli, Il “De Regno” di Francesco Patrizi, Rivista Internazionale di Filosofia del Diritto, XII (1932), pp. 716–38;
F. Battaglia, Enea Silvio Piccolomini e Francesco Patrizi, Siena, 1936;
G. M. Cappelli, Ad actionem secundum virtutem tendit. Vita activa e vita contemplativa nel pensiero umanistico, in F. Lisi (ed.), The Ways of Life in Classical political Philosophy, Sankt Augustin, Academia Verlag, 2004, pp. 203–30
M. S. Sapegno, Il trattato politico e utopico, in Letteratura italiana, dir. A. Asor Rosa, III/2. Le forme del testo: La prosa, Torino, Einaudi, 1984, p. 969-70.

1413 births
1494 deaths
Italian male writers
Bishops of Gaeta
15th-century Italian Roman Catholic bishops